Ursidae is a family of mammals in the order Carnivora, which includes the giant panda, brown bear, and polar bear, and many other extant or extinct mammals. A member of this family is called a bear or an ursid. They are widespread across the Americas and Eurasia. Bear habitats are generally forests, though some species can be found in grassland and savana regions, and the polar bear lives in arctic and aquatic habitats. Population sizes vary, with six species classified as vulnerable with populations as low as 500, while the brown bear has a population of over 100,000 and the American black bear around 800,000. Many bear species primarily eat specific foods, such as seals for the polar bear or termites and fruit for the sloth bear, but with the exception of the giant panda, which exclusively eats bamboo, ursids are omnivorous when necessary. No ursid species have been domesticated, though some bears have been trained for entertainment.

The eight species of Ursidae are split into five genera in three subfamilies: the monotypic Ailuropodinae, the panda bears; Tremarctinae, the short-faced bears; and Ursinae, containing all other extant bears. Extinct species have also been placed into all three extant subfamilies, as well as three extinct ones: Agriotheriinae, Hemicyoninae, and Ursavinae. Over 100 extinct Ursidae species have been found, though due to ongoing research and discoveries the exact number and categorization is not fixed.

Conventions

Conservation status codes listed follow the International Union for Conservation of Nature (IUCN) Red List of Threatened Species. Ranges are based on the IUCN Red List for that species unless otherwise noted. All extinct species or subspecies listed alongside extant species went extinct after 1500 CE, and are indicated by a dagger symbol "". Population figures are rounded to the nearest hundred.

Classification
The family Ursidae consists of eight extant species belonging to five genera in three subfamilies and divided into dozens of extant subspecies. This does not include ursid hybrid species such as grizzly–polar bear hybrids or extinct prehistoric species.

 Subfamily Ailuropodinae
 Genus Ailuropoda (panda bears): one species
 Subfamily Tremarctinae
 Genus Tremarctos (short-faced bears): one species
 Subfamily Ursinae
 Genus Helarctos: (sun bear): one species
 Genus Melursus: (sloth bear): one species
 Genus Ursus (bears): four species

Ursids
The following classification is based on the taxonomy described by Mammal Species of the World (2005), with augmentation by generally accepted proposals made since using molecular phylogenetic analysis; this includes the division of the giant panda into two subspecies. There are several additional proposals which are disputed, such as reclassifying the subspecies of the brown bear into a smaller set of clades, which are not included here.

Subfamily Ailuropodinae

Subfamily Tremarctinae

Subfamily Ursinae

Prehistoric ursids
In addition to extant bears, a number of prehistoric species have been discovered and classified as a part of Ursidae. In addition to being placed within the three extant subfamilies, they have been categorized within the extinct subfamilies Agriotheriinae, Hemicyoninae, and Ursavinae, some of which are subdivided into named tribes. There is no generally accepted classification of extinct ursid species. The species listed here are based on data from the Paleobiology Database, unless otherwise cited. Where available, the approximate time period the species was extant is given in millions of years before the present (Mya), also based on data from the Paleobiology Database. All listed species are extinct; where a genus or subfamily within Ursidae comprises only extinct species, it is indicated with a dagger symbol .

 Subfamily Agriotheriinae
 Genus Agriotherium
 A. africanum (3.6–2.5 Mya)
 A. gregoryi
 A. inexpetans (12–5.3 Mya)
 A. insigne
 A. schneideri (14–2.5 Mya)
 A. sivalensis (5.4–3.6 Mya)
 Subfamily Ailuropodinae
 Tribe Ailuropodini
 Genus Agriarctos
 Genus Ailurarctos
 A. lufengensis
 Genus Ailuropoda
 A. baconi (2.6–0.012 Mya)
 A. fovealis
 A. microta (2.6–0.78 Mya)
 A. wulingshanensis (2.6–0.78 Mya)
 Genus Kretzoiarctos (12–8.7 Mya)
 K. beatrix (12–8.7 Mya)
 Tribe Indarctini
 Genus Indarctos
 I. anthracitis
 I. arctoides (9.7–8.7 Mya)
 I. atticus (8.7–5.3 Mya)
 I. nevadensis (11–4.9 Mya)
 I. oregonensis (11–4.9 Mya)
 I. salmontanus
 I. vireti
 I. zdanskyi
 Genus Miomaci (12–9.7 Mya)
 M. pannonicum (12–9.7 Mya)
 Subfamily Hemicyoninae
 Tribe Cephalogalini
 Genus Adelpharctos (34–23 Mya)
 A. ginsburgi (29–23 Mya)
 A. mirus (34–28 Mya)
 Genus Cephalogale
 C. geoffroyi
 C. meschethense (29–23 Mya)
 C. minor (34–28 Mya)
 Genus Cyonarctos (29–23 Mya)
 C. dessei (29–23 Mya)
 Genus Filholictis
 F. filholi
 Genus Phoberogale
 P. depereti
 P. shareri (31–20 Mya)
 Tribe Hemicyonini
 Genus Dinocyon
 D. aurelianensis
 D. sansaniensis
 D. thenardi (17–15 Mya)
 Genus Hemicyon
 H. barbouri (14–10 Mya)
 H. goriachensis
 H. grivensis
 H. minor
 H. sansaniensis (16–12 Mya)
 H. statzlingii
 Genus Zaragocyon (23–20 Mya)
 Z. daamsi (23–20 Mya)
 Tribe Phoberocyonini
 Genus Phoberocyon
 P. aurelianensis (21–7.2 Mya)
 P. huerzeleri
 P. johnhenryi (21–15 Mya)
 Genus Plithocyon (16–11 Mya)
 P. armagnacensis (16–11 Mya)
 P. barstowensis (16–13 Mya)
 P. ursinus (16–13 Mya)
 Subfamily Tremarctinae
 Genus Arctodus (short-faced bear) (2.2–0.012 Mya)
 A. pristinus (lesser short-faced bear) (2.2–0.3 Mya)
 A. simus (giant short-faced bear) (1.1–0.012 Mya)
 Genus Arctotherium
 A. angustidens (1.2–0.7 Mya)
 A. bonariense (0.6–0.037 Mya)
 A. tarijense (0.5–0.010 Mya)
 A. vetustum (0.7–0.3 Mya)
 A. wingei (0.1–0.012 Mya)
 Genus Plionarctos (10.3–1.8 Mya)
 P. edensis (10.3–4.9 Mya)
 P. harroldorum (4.9–1.8 Mya)
 Genus Tremarctos (1.8 Mya–present)
 T. floridanus (Florida spectacled bear) (1.8–0.012 Mya)
 Subfamily Ursavinae
 Tribe Ursavini
 Genus Ursavus
 U. brevirhinus (16–9.7 Mya)
 U. elmensis (dawn bear) (16–13 Mya)
 U. pawniensis (24–5.3 Mya)
 U. primaevus (14–9.7 Mya)
 Subfamily Ursinae
 Genus Aurorarctos (15–12.5 Mya)
 A. tirawa (15–12.5 Mya)
 Genus Protarctos (4.9–3.6 Mya)
 P. abstrusus (4.9–3.6 Mya)
 Genus Ursus
 U. arctos priscus (steppe brown bear)
 U. arvernensis (3.2–2.5 Mya)
 U. deningeri (0.79–0.12 Mya) (Deninger's bear)
 U. dolinensis (Gran Dolina bear)
 U. dentrificius (2.6–0.12 Mya)
 U. etruscus (Etruscan bear)
 U. eogroenlandicus
 U. ingressus (Gamssulzen cave bear)
 U. inopinatus
 U. jenaensis
 U. labradorensis
 U. malayanus (0.13–0.012 Mya)
 U. maritimus tyrannus (tyrant polar bear)
 U. minimus (Auvergne bear) (4.2–2.5 Mya)
 U. optimus
 U. praemalayanus
 U. priscus
 U. rossicus (pleistocene small cave bear)
 U. spelaeus (cave bear) (2.6–0.012 Mya)
 U. spitzbergensis
 U. vitabilis

See also
 List of individual bears
 List of fictional bears

Notes

References

 
Ursidae
Ursidae